The Nantucket Beacon formed a range with the Brant Point Light to guide vessels into Nantucket harbor. Operated at various times in the 19th  century, it was deactivated sometime after 1870. This range was eventually succeeded by the Nantucket Harbor Range Lights, which are still in operation.

History
There have been many lights at Brant Point, dating to well before the American Revolution. The history of range lights is a bit murky, and different sources give different dates. A researcher for the Coast Guard historical office dates a separate range beacon to 1794, but congressional records show this beacon established in 1820. This structure was relocated many times, and in 1869 was positioned on Brant Point itself as the front light of the range; this proved unsatisfactory, and the light was moved back across the harbor the following year. Land was acquired around 1872 to relocate the light again and to provide for a keeper's house.

The date for removal of this light is unclear. An 1879 chart shows the beacon, and the following year's chart omits it; this is not a definitive indication, however, since no edition of the same chart prior to 1879 shows the beacon, even though other documents state it to have been operating. In the early 20th century new range lights were built on Brant Point, and the light itself was relocated to a new tower, obviating a separate rear range light.

References

Lighthouses completed in 1794
Towers completed in 1794
Lighthouses completed in 1856
Lighthouses in Nantucket, Massachusetts
1794 establishments in Massachusetts